Cameron Eustace Cuffy (born February 8, 1970) is a former West Indian cricketer, who, due to his height (6-foot 8 inches) was often likened to his predecessors in the West Indies side, Joel Garner and Curtly Ambrose.

International career
He made his Test debut against India in 1994. He dismissed Sachin Tendulkar three times in his Test career.

He was in and out of both the Test and one-day teams in the 1990s and after 2000, his international career was over. As a batsman, he was a tailender, averaging 4.14 in Test cricket.

Cuffy has the distinction of winning a man of the match award in a One Day International without scoring a run, taking a wicket or holding a catch. Playing against Zimbabwe at Harare in the opening fixture of a Coca-Cola Cup tournament on 23 June 2001 he won the match award for his analysis of 10–2–20–0. As the hosts managed only 239 for 9 in reply to 266 for 5 by West Indies, Cuffy's economy was crucial. No other bowler in the match conceded fewer than 35 runs from his full 10-over entitlement.

References

1970 births
Living people
Surrey cricketers
West Indies One Day International cricketers
West Indies Test cricketers
Windward Islands cricketers
Saint Vincent and the Grenadines cricketers